Subdoluseps samajaya is a species of skink found in Sarawak, Borneo (Malaysia).

References

Subdoluseps
Endemic fauna of Borneo
Endemic fauna of Malaysia
Reptiles of Malaysia
Reptiles described in 2018
Taxa named by Benjamin R. Karin
Taxa named by Elyse S. Freitas
Taxa named by Samuel Shonleben
Taxa named by Larry Lee Grismer
Taxa named by Aaron M. Bauer
Taxa named by Indraneil Das
Reptiles of Borneo